The Kinder Foundation is a Houston-based 501c3 nonprofit organization. It was established in 1997 by Richard Kinder and Nancy Kinder.
Since its establishment, the Kinder Foundation has committed more than $410 million in grants and transformation gifts to Houston projects.

Major projects 
The Kinder Foundation supports transformational urban park projects in the Houston area, as well as quality of life and education initiatives.

Green space

Discovery Green 
The Discovery Green park project grew from an idea by Maconda Brown O’Connor and Nancy Kinder to create an urban park in downtown Houston. Several philanthropic foundations joined the public-private partnership with the City of Houston in 2004 to create the park which was completed in 2008. As the first board chair for the nonprofit Discovery Green Conservancy, Nancy Kinder led the $54 million private fundraising campaign, contributing $10 million from the Kinder Foundation, for the overall $125 million project. Discovery Green opened in 2008, hosts more than 400 free events a year, and as of 2018, has spurred $1.4 billion in development around the park.

Buffalo Bayou Park 
The Buffalo Bayou Park is a 160-acre, 2.3 mile stretch of Buffalo Bayou's parkland inside Houston. In 2010, the foundation provided a catalyst gift of $30 million to Buffalo Bayou Partnership who, in conjunction with the City of Houston and Harris County Flood Control District, led the efforts to restore the area to a more natural and self-sustaining state, reintroduce native landscapes, and add amenities to enhance safety and convenience for visitors. The project was completed in 2015 and has received numerous accolades, including Urban Land Institute's Global Award for Excellence.

Memorial Park 
On April 25, 2018, the Kinder Foundation pledged $70 million to the Memorial Park Conservancy to accelerate the Memorial Park Master Plan. Highlights include completion of the park's Eastern Glades, improve connectivity to regional existing trails and create new trails within the park, relocate ball fields, build a running track at the running center, and develop a Memorial Grove.

Bayou Greenways 2020
In October 2013, it was announced that the foundation would give $50 million to the Houston Parks Board for the Bayou Greenways 2020 Project, one of the most ambitious park projects in the country. When complete in 2020, the $220 million project which will create 1,500 acres of new parkland within Houston and connect 150 miles of trails along the bayous.

Education

University of Missouri’s Kinder Institute on Constitutional Democracy
In 2014, the Kinder Foundation made possible the Kinder Forum on Constitutional Democracy at the University of Missouri, a new program to support excellence in the teaching and study of American constitutional and democratic traditions. In 2015, the foundation made a new, endowed gift of $25 million to MU to provide permanent support for the renamed Kinder Institute on Constitutional Democracy.

Quality of life

Rice University’s Kinder Institute for Urban Research 
Rice University’s Kinder Institute for Urban Research is dedicated to resolving issues that face some of the country's largest urban centers, including Houston. In 2010, the Kinder Foundation provided a $15 million grant to support expanded research in Houston and in major cities around the world, and the institute was renamed in their honor.

Museum of Fine Arts, Houston
In January 2015, the Kinder Foundation committed a principal gift of $50 million to the Museum of Fine Arts, Houston for the redevelopment of its 14-acre campus. In recognition of the gift, a new 164,000 square-foot building will be named the Nancy and Rich Kinder Building and will house 54,000 square feet of gallery space for exhibitions and for the Museum's collections of modern and contemporary art.

Other projects 
The Kinder Foundation has provided grants for Cristo Rey Jesuit College Preparatory of Houston; the Museum of Fine Arts, Houston; The Bush Center at Southern Methodist University; The Archdiocese of Galveston-Houston; and The Texas Heart Institute's Center for Coronary Artery Anomalies.

In October 2016 the Kinder Foundation obtained perpetual naming rights to Houston's High School For the Performing and Visual Arts for $7.5 million. The contract was approved by the school board after the Kinder Foundation said it would withdraw the funds if the board did not vote, six days after the public announcement of the deal. In April 2017, in response to a petition asking the Kinders to give the name back, Richard Kinder to wrote to the Superintendent of Houston Independent School District. Citing negative controversy, he offered to release the naming rights but did not request or suggest that the original name be restored. The issue is unresolved. The name change will be effective when the new downtown school building is occupied, expected to be January 2019.

Founders 
Richard Kinder is the executive chairman of Kinder Morgan, Inc. He and his wife Nancy Kinder signed the Giving Pledge in 2011, asserting their desire to donate 95 percent of their worth to charity at the time of their deaths. Rich and Nancy were 40th on Forbes’ Top 50 Givers list in 2018 and 33rd on the Chronicle of Philanthropy's "Philanthropy 50", a chronicle of the nation's biggest contributors to charitable organizations, in 2016. The Kinders also placed 28th on the Chronicle of Philanthropy's Philanthropy 50.

References

External links 

Non-profit organizations based in Houston
Kinder Morgan